Giovanni Marangoni (1673–1753) was a Roman Catholic priest and antiquarian.

Biography
He was born in Verona, and became a canon at the Cathedral of Anagni, and later an apostolic protonotary. He was named custodian of the Roman Catacombs.

Works
 Delle memorie sacre e profane dell'anfiteatro di Roma, volgarmente detto il Colosseo (about the Roman Colosseum) (1746)
 Istoria dell'antichissimo oratorio, o Capella di San Lorenzo nel patriarchio lateranense, comunemente appellato Sancta Sanctorum, e della celebre immagine del SS. Salvatore detta Acheropita, che ivi conservasi (Stamperia San Michele, Rome, 1747).
 Il Divoto Pellegrino Guidato, ed Istruito nella Visita delle quattro Basiliche di Roma, per il Giubileo dell'Anno Santo 1750., Stamperia del Characas, presso San Marco al Corso, Rome, 1749.
 Grandezze dell'Arcangelo San Michele nella Chiesa Trionfante, Militante, e Purgante, esposte in Dieci Lezioni, ed altrettante Meditazioni, e Considerazioni. Stamperia di Giovanni Zempel, 1739.
 Delle Cose Gentilesche e Profane Trasportate Ad Uso, e Adornamento delle Chiese. Stamperia di Niccolò e Marco Pagliarini, 1744.
 Delle Memorie Sagre e Civili dell'Antica Citta di Novana, oggi Civitanova, nella Provincia del Piceno. Stamperia di Giovanni Zempel. 1743.

References

External links 
 

1673 births
1753 deaths
18th-century Italian writers
18th-century Italian male writers
Italian antiquarians
People from Vicenza